Delphine Arnault (born 4 April 1975) is a French businesswoman, a director and executive vice president of Louis Vuitton (LVMH Group), and the CEO and chair of Dior since February 2023.

Early life
Arnault is the oldest child of Bernard Arnault from his first wife, Anne Dewavrin. She has a younger brother, Antoine Arnault. Between the ages of seven and 10, they lived in New York state where they attended a French-American school. She later earned degrees from the London School of Economics and EDHEC Business School (Ecole des Hautes Etudes Commerciales du Nord).

Career
Arnault began her career working McKinsey & Company for two years, and she joined LVMH in 2000.

Since 2003, Arnault has been a member of the management board of the group LVMH, the first woman and youngest person to occupy that post.

Arnault is also a member of the board of directors for Moët Hennessy, and M6, as well as a managing partner of a wealth management company.

In 2008, Arnault was named deputy chief of the designer Christian Dior Couture, which she quit in 2013 to join Louis Vuitton as director and executive vice president.

In May 2014, Arnault started the LVMH Prize, an international competition for young fashion designers. The objective of the LVMH group is discover the talents and creativity of new designers: "It is necessary to recognize the talent and creativity, as well as the ways in which we can best help the growth of their business", she confirmed.

In January 2023, it was announced she was appointed CEO and chair of Dior, effective in February.

Other directorships
 Gagosian Gallery, member of the board of directors (since 2021)
 20th Century Fox, member of the board of directors (since 2013)
 Céline, member of the board of directors (since 2011)
 Pucci, member of the board of directors (since 2007)
 Loewe, member of the board of directors (since 2002)
 Ferrari, member of the board of directors
 Havas, member of the board of directors (2013–2019)

Personal life
Arnault married Alessandro Vallarino Gancia, heir to the Italian winemaker Gancia, on 24 September 2005. They divorced in 2010.

She lives with her partner, French businessman Xavier Niel, with whom she has one daughter, Elisa, born on 17 August 2012, and a son, Joseph, born on 20 September 2016.

References 

French businesspeople in fashion
1975 births
Living people
Delphine
Directors of LVMH
French art collectors
Women art collectors
French billionaires
French chief executives
French cosmetics businesspeople
Alumni of the London School of Economics
McKinsey & Company people
21st-century French businesswomen
21st-century French businesspeople
21st-century women